The Order of the Republic of Trinidad and Tobago is the highest honour of Trinidad and Tobago.  Established in 2008, it replaced the Trinity Cross as the decoration for distinguished and outstanding service to the country.

Recipients

References

External links
ORDER OF THE REPUBLIC OF TRINIDAD AND TOBAGO
Office of the President » National Awards Ceremony » Events And Ceremonies » About The Awards
2011 Trinidad & Tobago National Awardees

 
Orders, decorations, and medals of Trinidad and Tobago
Awards established in 2008
2008 establishments in Trinidad and Tobago